Krechinsky's Wedding is a three-act comedy written by Aleksandr Sukhovo-Kobylin in 1854, based on a rumor in Moscow society about a card sharp who received a large sum of money from a usurer by pawning a false diamond. The author wrote parts of the play in prison while under suspicion for the murder of his mistress. The comedy the first play in a dramatic trilogy Pictures of the Past, which also includes The Trial and Tarelkin's Death. The play was first published in 1856 in volume 57, issue 5 of the journal The Contemporary.

Film versions 
 Krechinsky's Wedding (1953 film), directed by Aleksey Zolotnitsky
 Krechinsky's Wedding (1974 film), directed by Vladimir Vorobyov
 Krechinsky's Wedding (1975 film), directed by Mariya Muat and Leonid Kheyfets
 Joker (2002 film), directed by Mikhail Kozakov
 Krechinsky's Wedding (2011 film), directed by P. Khomsky

Bibliography 
 Lotman L. M. "Sukhovo-Kobylin". In Istoriia russkoi literatury v 10 tomakh, 8:487–509. Moscow, Leningrad: Izdatel'stvo AN SSSR, 1956.
 Gol'diner V. "Sukhovo-Kobylin". In Literaturnaia entsiklopediia v 11 tomakh, 11:122–128. Moscow: Khudozhestvennaia literatura, 1939.
 Sokolinskii, E. K., ed. A. V. Sukhovo-Kobylin: bibliograficheskii ukazatel' literatury o zhizni i tvorchestve pisatelia, postanovkakh trilogii. St. Petersburg: Giperion, 2001. .
 Starosel'skaia N. D. Sukhovo-Kobylin. Moscow: Molodaia gvardiia, 2003. .
 Tunimanov V. "Krechinskii i Raspliuev". In Sukhovo-Kobylin A. V.: Svad'ba Krechinskogo, 86–95. Leningrad: Detskaia literatura, 1983.

1854 plays
Russian plays